Chhindwara (छिंदवाड़ा) Lok Sabha constituency is one of the 29 Lok Sabha constituencies in Madhya Pradesh state in Central India. This constituency came into existence in 1951, and it presently covers the entire Chhindwara district.

Assembly segments
Most Lok Sabha seats in MP and Chhattisgarh, with few seats like Durg (which has nine assembly segments under it) being exceptions, have 8 assembly seats as their segments. This seat is among the exceptions. Chhindwara and Satna have 7 assembly segments under them. Chhindwara Lok Sabha constituency comprises the following seven Vidhan Sabha (Legislative Assembly) segments:

Members of Parliament

^ by poll

Election Results

2019 Indian general election

2014 Indian general election

2009 Indian general election

2004 Indian general election

1999 Indian general election

1998 Indian general election

By election, 1997

1996 Indian general election

1991 Indian general election

1989 Indian general election

1984 Indian general election

1980 Indian general election

See also
 Chhindwara district
 List of Constituencies of the Lok Sabha

References

Lok Sabha constituencies in Madhya Pradesh
Chhindwara district